Madhepura Assembly constituency is an assembly constituency in Madhepura district in the Indian state of Bihar.  In 2015 Bihar Legislative Assembly election, Madhepura will be one of the 36 seats to have VVPAT enabled electronic voting machines.

Overview
As per Delimitation of Parliamentary and Assembly constituencies Order, 2008, No. 73 Madhepura Assembly constituency is composed of the following:
Madhepura, Ghamharia and Ghailadh community development blocks; Belo, Nadhi, Jitapur, Bhatkhora, Tamot Parsa and Parwa Navtol gram panchayats of Murliganj CD Block.

Madhepura Assembly constituency is part of No. 13 Madhepura (Lok Sabha constituency) .

Members of Legislative Assembly

Election results

2020
{{Election box candidate with party link|

References

External links
 

Assembly constituencies of Bihar
Politics of Madhepura district